The Mei-Ling Fine Arts Museum is an art museum in Puzi Art Park, Puzi City, Chiayi County, Taiwan.

Architecture
The museum spans over an area of 1,653 m2. The building consists of the administrative office, collection area, exhibition hall and four regions of learning classroom.

Temporary exhibitions
 Tibetan and Mongolian Art and Culture

See also
 List of museums in Taiwan

References

Art museums and galleries in Taiwan
Museums in Chiayi County